Shafiq ur Rehman Paracha is a retired member of the Civil Service of Sindh. He served in various key administrative and secretarial capacities, including Deputy Commissioner of Hyderabad, Larkana, Karachi, Mirpurkhas, Tharparkar and Sukkur, Commissioner of Karachi, Food Secretary, Excise and Taxation Secretary, Information Secretary and Education Secretary. He served as the first DCO of Karachi.

After his retirement, Paracha served as Project Director Lyari Expressway Resettlement Project and Director General Lyari Development Authority. Since 2008 he had been given the additional charge of Project Director of Sindh Village Improvement Project, Lyari Development Package and Sehwan and Bhit Shah Development Projects. Paracha resigned as Project Director in July 2009 and was appointed as the Registrar High Court of Sindh.

In December 2010, Shafiq-ur-Rehman Paracha was given the post of Project Director, Government of Sindh Housing Project for the families of Shuhda.

In 2007, he arranged for a 10-acre plot of land to be allotted to the Shah Mangowal Paracha association for the purpose of graveyard (Qabrustan).

In 2008, he assisted with the planning of the city of Bhit Shah, and said it "has to be planned as a cultural city with good health and education facilities to create an environment to entice the people traveling on the National High(way) to visit the mazar and the city."

References

Pakistani civil servants
Living people
Year of birth missing (living people)